The Flint Rogues Rugby Football Club is a rugby union team from Flint, Michigan and member of USA Rugby, Division III Midwest Rugby Eastern Conference, Northern League
and Division III of the Michigan Rugby Football Union.

History
In March 1972, Larry Marfechuk and Jim Keener became the founding members of the Flint Rogues Rugby Football Club when they gathered a group of male athletes and taught them the game of rugby football. Back in 1972, the game was not as widespread in the State of Michigan as it is now and the Rogues were one of the first senior men's rugby teams in the state. The original uniform was red/white/blue in color but was replaced with the current colors of red/white/black.

In 1976, the Flint Rogues were a top contender in the State of Michigan. The club traveled to many tournaments out of state as far as Missouri and Louisiana. In 1980, the club brought home the B Division Championship for the Michigan Rugby Union in 1980 and also a Consolation Trophy for the B Division at the Great Lakes Rugby Tournament in Detroit. In 1984, the Flint Rogues won the Michigan Cup, First Division state title. In 1990, the Rogues won the Division II Michigan Cup, winning it again in 1992. In 1993, the Rogues won the Battle Creek 7's tournament and qualified for the Midwest 7's for the only time in club history.

The club experienced a good run from the late 1990s and into the early 2000s, being promoted to Division II of the Michigan Rugby Union. The club won the Division II Michigan Cup consecutively in 2002 and 2003. After a winless season in 2008, the Rogues rebounded, posting a 5-1 record in the 2009 spring season. The Rogues had a perfect fall 2010 season, going 7-0, winning Midwest Rugby's Northern League championship and earning a playoff berth for the first time in several seasons.

Sponsorship

The Flint Rogues RFC have had Budweiser as their primary shirt sponsor for over a decade; the Rogues also have several secondary sponsorships from many local businesses as well.

Club Honors
       1980 - Michigan Rugby Union B Division Championship
       1980 - Consolation Trophy, B Division, Detroit Great Lakes Tournament
       1984 - Division I Michigan Cup
       1990, 1992, 2002, 2003 - Division II Michigan Cup
       1993 - Battle Creek 7s Tournament Champions
       1993 - Qualified for USA Rugby Midwest 7s Tournament
      1997, 2000 - Kalamazoo Snowball Tournament Champions
       Rogues Cup (played for annually against the Windsor Rogues RFC) Winners - 2005, 2006, 2007, 2009, 2010, 2011
       Victory Cup (played for annually against the Tri-City Barbarians RFC) Winners - 2006, 2007, 2009, 2010, 2011
       2010 - Midwest Rugby Union Northern League Champions

Our Opponents
Battle Creek Griffins RFC 
Detroit RFC 
Detroit Tradesmen RFC 
Findlay SCARS RFC 
Fort Wayne RFC 
Grand Rapids Gazelles RFC 
Kalamazoo Dogs RFC 
Michiana Moose RFC 
Michigan RFC 
Oakland Highlanders RFC 
Toledo Celtics RFC 
Traverse City Blues RFC 
Tri-City Barbarians RFC 
Windsor Rogues RFC

Game Results
2010 Season

References

External links
Official Site
USA Rugby
Midwest Rugby Union
Grand Blanc High School Boys Rugby
Flint Rugby (Wales)

American rugby union teams
Rugby union teams in Michigan
Rugby clubs established in 1972
Sports in Flint, Michigan